Martin Westmont (born 30 October, 1978) is a Swedish politician and former school teacher who has served as a Member of the Riksdag for the Sweden Democrats party since 2022. He represents the Stockholm Municipality constituency.

Westmont stood for the Sweden Democrats in the 2022 Swedish general election but was not elected, and instead served as a substitute to Gabriel Kroon. In October 2022, he was appointed to the Riksdag after Kroon resigned to focus on his leadership of the SD chapter in Stockholm. In the Riksdag, Westmont serves as a member of the civil and EU committees. He is also a regional councilor in Stockholm County where he serves on the board of education.

See also 

 List of members of the Riksdag, 2022–2026

References 

1978 births
Living people
Politicians from Stockholm
21st-century Swedish politicians
Members of the Riksdag from the Sweden Democrats
Members of the Riksdag 2022–2026